Cutuno is an unincorporated community within Magoffin County, Kentucky, United States.

References

Unincorporated communities in Magoffin County, Kentucky
Unincorporated communities in Kentucky